Claudia Nystad ( Künzel, born 1 February 1978) is a German top-level woman cross-country skier. She was born in Zschopau, East Germany, and represents the sports club WSC Erzgebirge Oberwiesenthal. Besides her civilian sports career, she serves as a sports soldier with the German Federal Armed Forces.

Cross-country skiing results
All results are sourced from the International Ski Federation (FIS).

Olympic Games
 6 medals – (2 gold, 3 silver, 1 bronze)

World Championships
 5 medals – (1 gold, 4 silver)

a.  Cancelled due to extremely cold weather.

World Cup

Season standings

Individual podiums
4 victories – (2 , 2 ) 
26 podiums – (21 , 5 )

Team podiums
 7 victories – (4 , 3 ) 
 26 podiums – (17 , 9 )

Personal life
On June 27, 2005, Künzel married Trond Nystad from Norway, ex-coach of the American cross-country ski team.

In the summer of 2007, Künzel donated her gold medal from the 2002 Winter Olympics to benefit the 'Hansel und Gretel' foundation (Hansel and Gretel in German) committed to helping abused children.

Honours and awards
 Saxon Sportswoman of the Year (2007 and 2010)
 Silver Bay Leaf (2002, 2006 and 2010)
 Badge of Honour of the German Ski Association in Gold (2010)
 Bundeswehr Cross of Honour in Gold (2004)
 Badge of Honour of the Bundeswehr (2002)

References

External links

  
 
 
 
 
 

1978 births
Living people
People from Zschopau
Cross-country skiers at the 2002 Winter Olympics
Cross-country skiers at the 2006 Winter Olympics
Cross-country skiers at the 2010 Winter Olympics
Cross-country skiers at the 2014 Winter Olympics
German female cross-country skiers
Tour de Ski skiers
Olympic cross-country skiers of Germany
Olympic gold medalists for Germany
Olympic silver medalists for Germany
Olympic bronze medalists for Germany
Olympic medalists in cross-country skiing
FIS Nordic World Ski Championships medalists in cross-country skiing
Medalists at the 2014 Winter Olympics
Medalists at the 2010 Winter Olympics
Medalists at the 2006 Winter Olympics
Medalists at the 2002 Winter Olympics
Recipients of the Badge of Honour of the Bundeswehr
Sportspeople from Saxony